Wayne Long is an American politician. He is the member for the 39th district of the Arkansas House of Representatives.

Life and career 
Long lived in Bradford, Arkansas.

In June 2022, Long defeated Robert Griffin in the Republican primary election for the 39th district of the Arkansas House of Representatives. In November 2022, he defeated Clayton Hall in the general election, winning 87 percent of the votes. He succeeded Mark Lowery. He assumes his office in 2023.

Long is a former justice of the peace.

References 

Living people
Year of birth missing (living people)
Place of birth missing (living people)
Republican Party members of the Arkansas House of Representatives
21st-century American politicians